Kopaszyn may refer to the following places in Poland:
Kopaszyn, Lower Silesian Voivodeship (south-west Poland)
Kopaszyn, Greater Poland Voivodeship (west-central Poland)